The National Search and Rescue Agency (formerly named , both abbreviated Basarnas) is a government agency of Indonesia. Its head office is in Kemayoran, Central Jakarta, Jakarta.

Task 
According to presidential decree No. 99/2007 regarding National Search and Rescue Agency Republic of Indonesia, Basarnas primary to task are to assist president in implementation of search and rescue activity in Indonesia.

Function
Formulation of national and general policies in search and rescue;
Formulation of technical policies in search and rescue;
Policy coordination, planning and program development in search and rescue;
Guidance, deployment, oversee search and rescue resources;
Implementation of search and rescue;
Implementation of initial operation of search and rescue;
Coordinating search and rescue resources in search and rescue operation;
Training and human resource development in the field of search and rescue;
Research and development in the field of search and rescue;
Information management and communication in the field of search and rescue;
Implementing relation and cooperation in the field of search and rescue;
Management of state assets/property within Basarnas;
Guidance and general administration servicesin the field of search and rescue;
Supervise over Basarnas' task and activity;
Provide report, suggestion and consideration in the field of search and rescue;

Organisational structure 
Head of Basarnas (Kepala Badan SAR Nasional), Head of Basarnas is directly appointed and responsible to president.
Secretariate General (Sekretariat Utama), its primary task are to assist in general affairs and report directly to Head of Basarnas, and it consist of 3 bureaus:
Bureau of General Affairs (Biro Umum)
Bureau of Planning and Foreign Cooperation (Biro Perencanaan dan Kerjasama Teknik Luar Negeri)
Bureau of Law and Human Resources (Biro Hukum dan Kepegawaian)
Deputy of Search and Rescue Resources (Deputi Bidang Potensi SAR)
Directorate of Facilities and Infrastructure (Direktorat Sarana dan Prasarana) 
Directorate of Resource Development and Search and Rescue Community (Direktorat Bina Ketenagaan dan Pemasyarakatan SAR)
Deputy of Search and Rescue Operation (Deputi Bidang Operasi SAR)
Directorate of Operation and Training (Direktorat Operasi dan Latihan) 
Directorate of Communication (Direktorat Komunikasi)
Data and Information Center (Pusat Data dan Informasi), a supporting unit within basarnas
Inspectorate (Inspektorat)
Technical Unit (Unit Pelaksana Teknis''), its primary task to implement search and rescue activity in regional level, which consist of 13 Technical Unit Office Class A and 21 Technical Unit Office Class B.

Head of National Search and Rescue Agency

List of major operations 
Aviation
 Adam Air Flight 574 (2007)
 Sukhoi Superjet 100 crash (2012)
 Indonesia AirAsia Flight QZ8501 (2014)
Lion Air Flight 610 (2018)

Ship Transportation
 KM Levina (2007)

References

External links

 National Search and Rescue Agency 

Government agencies of Indonesia
Rescue agencies